Asdrúbal Paniagua Ramírez (born 29 July 1951, in San Rafael de Heredia) is a retired professional football player from Costa Rica.

Better known as Yuba, he played most of his career for Deportivo Saprissa, where he is still remembered as an idol.

Career

Club career
Paniagua is vastly recalled for his great shooting skills, his excellent passing abilities and sense of team organizement inside the field. Overall, he was a short midfielder, with extraordinary talent, and was part of the famous Saprissa's midfield whose way of playing made history in the CONCACAF region.

Paniagua was part of the mythical Saprissa squad that won six consecutive championships from 1972 to 1977, a record both in Costa Rica as well as in the Americas. He was the club's leading scorer with twelve goals in 1974.

Paniagua also won three titles with Herediano.

International career
Paniagua appeared in 36 matches for the full Costa Rica national football team from 1971 to 1985, scoring 3 goals, and represented his country in 3 FIFA World Cup qualification matches. He played for Costa Rica at the 1975 Pan American Games.

Personal life
Paniagua is married to Ligia Fuentes and has fathered seven children; Andrea, Ana Lucrecia, Rebecca, Ana Sofia, Fiorela, Kevin Hasdrubal and Asley. After retiring, he fell into a depression and became an alcoholic but he beat his addiction and worked as a sales agent for Grupo TACA. Ironically, he survived a serious car crash after being hit by a drunk-driver in 1997.

References

1951 births
Living people
People from Heredia Province
Association football midfielders
Costa Rican footballers
Costa Rica international footballers
Deportivo Saprissa players
C.S. Herediano footballers
Pan American Games competitors for Costa Rica
Footballers at the 1975 Pan American Games